Liu Jiacen (born 30 March 1989) is a Chinese basketball player. She represented China at the 2018 FIBA Women's Basketball World Cup.

References

External links

Living people
1989 births
Basketball players from Heilongjiang
People from Jixi
Chinese women's basketball players
Centers (basketball)
Heilongjiang Dragons players
Asian Games medalists in basketball
Basketball players at the 2018 Asian Games
Asian Games gold medalists for China
Medalists at the 2018 Asian Games